Grand Marais Creek is a  tributary of the Red River of the North in northwestern Minnesota, the United States.  Via the Red River, Lake Winnipeg, and the Nelson River, it is part of the Hudson Bay watershed.

See also
List of rivers of Minnesota

References
Notes

Sources
Minnesota Watersheds
USGS Hydrologic Unit Map – State of Minnesota (1974)

Rivers of Minnesota
Rivers of Polk County, Minnesota
Tributaries of Hudson Bay